Alberta Provincial Highway No. 16A, commonly referred to as Highway 16A, is the designation of three alternate routes off Alberta Highway 16 (the Yellowhead highway) in Alberta, Canada. The Evansburg – Entwistle section is called 16A:08 by Alberta Transportation, while 16A:24 runs through Vegreville. The section west of Edmonton is labelled 16A:14 and 16A:16 on Alberta Transportation maps, but is better known as Parkland Highway and Stony Plain Road.

Evansburg – Entwistle 
Highway 16A:08 parallels Highway 16 to the north, intersecting Highway 22, and passing through Evansburg, Pembina River Provincial Park, and Entwistle.

Major intersections 
Starting from the west end of Highway 16A:

Parkland Highway 

The highway starts west of Stony Plain, Alberta near the hamlet of Carvel. Parkland Highway is a central thoroughfare through the bedroom communities of Stony Plain and Spruce Grove. At Acheson it intersects with Highway 60. Highway 16A enters Edmonton along Stony Plain Road, splits into one-way streets where eastbound traffic follows 100 Avenue, before ending at Anthony Henday Drive (Highway 216).

Highway 16A and the Parkland Highway were established in 1997 when the Highway 16 designation was moved to Highway 16X, a bypass route that became Yellowhead Trail in Edmonton.

Major intersections

Vegreville 
Highway 16A:24 runs through the Town of Vegreville as 50 Avenue.

Major intersections 
Starting from the west end of Highway 16A:

Former alignments

Strathcona County 

Highway 16A used to follow Baseline Road (101 Avenue), past Refinery Row, and linked with Highway 16 in Strathcona County. In 1996, the province reverted the Baseline Road to Strathcona County while the north–south section became part of Highway 14X.
Highway 14X was later renumbered Highway 216 in 1999, and signed as a part of Anthony Henday Drive in 2010.

Downtown Edmonton 

The Strathcona County segment of Highway 16A used to be part of a larger route which passed through central Edmonton, itself an original alignment of Highway 16.
At the time, Highway 16 entered west Edmonton along Stony Plain Road and followed Mayfield Road, and Highway 16A originated at the intersection of Highway 16, Stony Plain Road, Mayfield Road.

Highway 16A was phased out in the early 1980s.

References 

016A
Roads in Edmonton
Roads in Strathcona County
Former segments of the Trans-Canada Highway